Chok-Tal is a village in the Issyk-Kul District of the Issyk-Kul Region of Kyrgyzstan. Its population was 1,910 in 2021. It is located on the northern shore of Lake Issyk Kul between Tamchy and Cholpon Ata.

References

Populated places in Issyk-Kul Region